Ants Laaneots (born 16 January 1948) is an Estonian politician and former military officer. He was previously the Commander of the Estonian Defence Forces and a veteran officer in the Soviet Army. Laaneots previously served as the Commandant of the Estonian National Defence College from 2001 to 2006. He was appointed the Commander-in-Chief on 5 December 2006 and was promoted to general in 2011. After retiring from the military, he became a politician.

Early life and education
Laaneots was born on 16 January 1948 in Kilingi-Nõmme, Estonia. In 1948 the NKVD arrested his father for being a forest brother. For that he was deported to Siberia between 1949–1958. His mother died there in 1952. A year after finishing school, he worked as an assistant to a railway mechanic at Pääsküla railway station. In July 1966 he entered the Higher Military School in Kharkiv, Ukraine, and graduated in 1970 as an Army Tank Officer assigned to the Kiev Military District. He specialized in the T-64 Tank.

Career
From 1970 to 1978, he served as a platoon leader, company commander, and battalion commander of the 300th Tank Regiment for the Soviet Army in Ukraine, mostly commanding fleets of T-64 Tanks. From 1978 to 1981, Laaneots studied in the Malinovsky Military Academy of Armored Forces in Moscow for an armored brigade commander's course, and to qualify on the newly introduced T-80 Tank.. From 1981 to 1987, he was posted to the Soviet-Chinese border in Eastern Kazakhstan. During this assignment he served as the Executive Officer of the 96th Tank Regiment, two years as the Commander of the 180th Tank Regiment, and three years as the Deputy Commander-Chief of Staff of the 78th Armored Division.

From 1987 to 1989, he deployed to Ethiopia where he spent one year as the military advisor to the commander of an infantry division, and a year and a half as the military advisor to the commanding general of an army corps participating in combat activities. Before his resignation from the Soviet Army in September 1991, he served as the Chief of Regional Department of Defence, Tartu in Estonia.

After 1991
Laaneots was one of the founding-officers of the Estonian Army, defecting from the Soviet Army after the August 1991 attempted coup in Moscow. After Estonia regained its independence in 1991, Laaneots served two times as the Chief of the General Staff – from 1991 to 1994, and from 1997 to 1999. He was crucial in transforming the doctrine and tactics of the Estonian Defence Forces from a Soviet mode to a NATO and western mode. From 1994 to 1996 he was in reserve (Director of the Security company AS ESS Lõuna). In 1997 Laaneots was appointed to the position of Inspector General of the Defence Forces. During his second tenure, in 1998, he graduated from the NATO Defence College in Rome, Italy.

In 1998, he was promoted to kindralmajor (English: Major general). In 2000, after a year at the course in the Finnish National Defence College, he was appointed the head of the Baltic Defence Research Centre located in Estonia. From September 2001 through to December 2006, he was Commandant of the Estonian National Defence College. Ants Laaneots was appointed the Commander of the Defence Forces on 5 December 2006. He stepped down as Commander of the Defence Forces on 5 December 2011 after his 5-year term ended.

Politics
As of 12 December 2011, he worked as prime minister Andrus Ansip's advisor in matters of national defence. That job ended on 28 March 2014 at the end of Andrus Ansip's term in office. Laaneots joined the Reform Party in late 2014. In the 2015 parliamentary election, Laaneots was elected to the parliament with 5,907 individual votes.

In 2016, after NATO soldiers in Estonia were targeted with racist insults by locals, Laaneots stated that Russians directed the vitriol in order to compromise the relationship between Estonia and the U.S.

Effective dates of promotion

Soviet Army
See Military ranks of the Soviet Union

Estonian Army
See Military ranks of Estonia

Awards, decorations, and recognition

Awards and decorations

Personal life
His main research interests include modern conflicts, conflicts involving small states/nations, development of national defence. Since 1999, he has 48 publications, among others 1 monograph, 3 academic papers published in international journals and 15 other academic papers.

In addition to the Estonian language, General Laaneots is fluent in English, Russian, Belarusian, and Finnish. He is an active member of the Estonian National Defence League and the Rotary Club. He is married to a Ukrainian-Moldovan woman named Natalia and has a son and a daughter (and four grandchildren).

References

External links

|-

|-
 

1948 births
Commanders First Class of the Order of the Polar Star
Estonian generals
Estonian Reform Party politicians
Foreign recipients of the Legion of Merit
Living people
Members of the Riigikogu, 2015–2019
Members of the Riigikogu, 2019–2023
Members of the Riigikogu, 2023–2027
People from Kilingi-Nõmme
Recipients of the Military Order of the Cross of the Eagle, Class I
Recipients of the Military Order of the Cross of the Eagle, Class II
Recipients of the Order of the Red Star
Soviet colonels